Giacomo Banchelli (born 14 June 1973 in Vinci, Tuscany) is a former Italian football player who last played as a striker for A.C. Pistoiese. He started playing for Serie A in ACF Fiorentina when he was 16 years old. After that, he played for many teams including Cagliari e Atalanta and a few Serie B teams.

Honours
Fiorentina
Coppa Italia: 1995–96

References

External links

1973 births
Living people
People from Vinci, Tuscany
Italian footballers
Serie A players
Serie B players
ACF Fiorentina players
U.S. Alessandria Calcio 1912 players
Udinese Calcio players
Cagliari Calcio players
A.C. Reggiana 1919 players
Atalanta B.C. players
U.S. Pistoiese 1921 players
Empoli F.C. players
Taranto F.C. 1927 players
A.C. Montichiari players
Atletico Roma F.C. players
Association football forwards
Scandicci Calcio players
Sportspeople from the Metropolitan City of Florence
Footballers from Tuscany